New Zealand Australians refers to Australian citizens whose origins are in New Zealand, as well as New Zealand migrants and expatriates based in Australia. Migration from New Zealand to Australia is a common phenomenon, given Australia's proximity to New Zealand, its larger economy and cultural links between the two countries.

History

20th century
Under various arrangements since the 1920s, there has been a free flow of people between Australia and New Zealand. Since 1973 the informal Trans-Tasman Travel Arrangement has allowed for the free movement of citizens of one nation to the other. The only major exception to these travel privileges is for individuals with outstanding warrants or criminal backgrounds who are deemed dangerous or undesirable for the migrant nation and its citizens. In recent decades, many New Zealanders have migrated to Australian cities such as Sydney, Brisbane, Melbourne and Perth.

New Zealanders in Australia were previously granted permanent residency upon arrival in Australia with, like all permanent residents, immediate access to Australian welfare benefits. However, in 1986 the Hawke Labor Government brought in the rule whereby New Zealanders had to wait six months after arrival to qualify for social security benefits.

Special Category Visa
In 1994, the Keating Labor Government introduced special category visas for New Zealand citizens, which included the denial of HECS fee help and Austudy payments for tertiary study unless SCV holders became Australian citizens. Despite the increased immigration restrictions, net migration from New Zealand to Australia has still continued.

In 1998, the Howard Government increased the stand down period for general welfare payments to two years, which is the standard waiting period for all permanent residents in Australia. It is important to note that, during these changes, New Zealand citizens remained as Permanent Residents upon arrival in Australia, with the same basic rights and pathway to citizenship as all Permanent Residents.

2001 immigration legislative changes

Regulations were dramatically changed in 2001 by The Family and Community Services Legislation Amendment (New Zealand Citizens) Bill 2001 which categorizes New Zealanders who arrived in Australia after 26 February 2001 as non-protected special visa holders. That makes them ineligible for many social security benefits. Those New Zealanders can stay in Australia indefinitely but without any civic rights (they cannot vote in any Government elections) or route to citizenship. More than 175,000 people – or 47 per cent of the New Zealanders living in Australia – are thought to be affected by the law, which has been labelled "discriminatory" by campaigners.

In 2011, a series of anti-discrimination lawsuits overturned decisions to deny New Zealand citizens social security benefits under 2001 Howard government laws that restricted access to permanent residency. Australian citizens who go and live in New Zealand continue to enjoy the social security benefits and are treated as permanent residents in New Zealand.

In June 2011 Australian Prime Minister Julia Gillard and New Zealand Prime Minister John Key discussed the issue and Australia was reported to be looking at easing residency requirements for up to 100,000 New Zealanders stuck in limbo after the rule change in 2001. There are complaints in New Zealand that there is a brain drain to Australia.

Section 501 character test and subsequent developments
In 2014, the Australian Government amended the Migration Act to allow the cancellation of Australian visas for non-citizens on character grounds, including having been sentenced to prison for more than twelve months. The stricter character requirements also target non-citizens who have lived in Australia for most of their lives. By July 2018, about 1,300 New Zealanders had been deported from Australia on character grounds. At least 60% of New Zealanders living in Australia who were deported on character grounds were of Māori and Pacific Islander descent. While Australian officials have defended the tougher deportation measures, their New Zealand counterparts have warned that these would damage the historical "bonds of mateship" between the two countries.

In February 2016, the Australian and New Zealand Prime Ministers Malcolm Turnbull and John Key reached a deal to grant a pathway to Australian citizenship for New Zealanders living in Australia who were earning five times over the average wage. In July 2017, the Australian Government introduced the "Skilled Independent visa (subclass 189)" to fast-track the Australian citizenship naturalisation process for New Zealanders living in Australia. Under this visa, New Zealanders who have lived in Australia for at least five years and earning an annual income over A$53,900 can apply for Australian citizenship. Between 60,000 and 80,000 New Zealanders are eligible for the Skilled Independent Visa. According to the Australian Broadcasting Corporation (ABC), 1,512 skilled independent visas had been issued by late February 2018 with another 7,500 visas still being processed. This visa scheme was criticized by the "Ozkiwi lobby" since two thirds of New Zealanders living in Australia did not meet the qualifying wage.

In mid-July 2018, the ABC aired a controversial documentary entitled "Don't call Australia Home" showcasing the accelerated deportation of New Zealand nationals under Australia's immigration "character test." ABC guest host Peter FitzSimons interviewed three of the deported New Zealanders, who had subsequently resettled in New Zealand. The documentary featured the Justice Minister of New Zealand, Andrew Little, who criticized the high deportation rate on human rights grounds. The ABC documentary and Little's remarks provoked criticism from several Australian officials, including Home Affairs Minister Peter Dutton and Assistant Home Affairs Minister Alex Hawke, who defended Australia's immigration policies on law and order grounds.

Many New Zealanders living, studying and working in Australia under the Special Category Visa were adversely affected by the COVID-19 pandemic; with many being unable to access Centrelink payments. On 30 March 2020, Australian Prime Minister Scott Morrison announced that Special Category Visa holders would be eligible for AU$1,500 fortnightly payments as hardship assistance following negotiations with New Zealand Prime Minister Jacinda Ardern.

On 6 July 2022, Australian Prime Minister Anthony Albanese confirmed that New Zealand Special Category Visa holders would be eligible for flood relief assistance in response to the 2022 New South Wales floods. This flood relief assistance consists of a one-off means-tested payment of A$1,000 for adults and A$400 for children. NZ Prime Minister Ardern welcomed the development as a positive step in Australian-New Zealand bilateral relations. On 8 July, Albanese confirmed plans to expand voting rights and citizenship pathways for New Zealand citizens residing in Australia. In addition, he also indicated that the Albanese government would "tweak" the Section 501 deportation policy to consider individuals' long-term connection to Australia.

Demographics
By 2001 there were eight times more New Zealanders living in Australia than Australians living in New Zealand. Many such New Zealanders include Māori Australians and Pacific Islanders. People born in New Zealand continue to be the second largest source of immigration to Australia, representing 11% of total permanent additions in 2005–06 and accounting for 2.3% of Australia's population at June 2006. Australians make up a similar proportion of New Zealand's population.

According to the 2011 Census, there were 187,212 people of New Zealand descent in Australia and 483,398 New Zealand-born people residing in the country at the moment of the census, an increase of 24.1 per cent compared to the 2006 Census. The largest New Zealand-born community in Australia was in the state of Queensland, with 192,037 people.

In 2013, there were about 650,000 New Zealand citizens living in Australia, which was about 15 per cent of the population of New Zealand.

Geographic distribution

More New Zealand-born people in Australia were concentrated in Queensland than any other state, with more than half of those in Queensland living in the city of Brisbane. New South Wales was home to the second largest Kiwi-born population with 114,231 people of which 81,064 were located in its largest city, Sydney. The third largest population was found in the state of Victoria with 80,235 people. The state of Western Australia had the fourth largest population with 70,735 people of which 33,751 were located in the city of Perth.

Socio-economics
New Zealand citizens have a high labour-force participation rate (78.2 per cent at July 2012) compared with those born in Australia (68.0 per cent). New Zealanders living in Australia also have a higher median weekly income ($760) than Australians born in Australia ($597) and immigrants in general ($538), which may be partially due to working longer hours (51.8 hours per week) than the Australian-born (45.6 hours) or immigrants in general (44.7 hours).

Cultural background
New Zealand is a multicultural country with a multiethnic society. Because of this, New Zealanders have different and diverse ethnic backgrounds. However, the majority of New Zealanders, both in Australia and New Zealand, are Pākehā (New Zealanders of European descent), mainly of British ancestry. In the 2011 Census most New Zealand-born people living in Australia reported being of English descent (222,956), followed by those of New Zealander (86,724), Scottish (83,156) and Māori (82,577) descent.

Language

The main languages spoken by New Zealand-born people in Australia were English (440,649), Samoan (11,931) and Māori (8,067).

See also

 Australia – New Zealand relations
 Australian New Zealanders
 Europeans in Oceania
 Expatriate Party of New Zealand
 Immigration to Australia
 Māori Australians

References

External links
  (History of New Zealanders in Sydney)

Australian people of New Zealand descent
 
Immigration to Australia
Australia
Oceanian Australian